James Quinter Bucher (March 24, 1911 – October 21, 2004) was an infielder/outfielder in Major League Baseball who played for the Brooklyn Dodgers (1934–1937), St. Louis Cardinals (1938) and Boston Red Sox (1944–1945). A native of Manassas, Virginia, Bucher batted left-handed and threw right-handed. He debuted on April 18, 1934 and played his final game on September 29, .

Bucher was a defensively versatile player with decent abilities at third base, second, and any of the three outfield positions. His most productive season came with the 1935 Dodgers, when he posted career-highs in batting average (.302), home runs (7), RBI (58), runs (72), hits (143), doubles (22), and games played (123). In 1937, he was sent to the Cardinals along with Johnny Cooney in the same trade that brought Leo Durocher to Brooklyn. He ended his majors career with the Boston Red Sox.

In a seven-season career, Bucher was a .265 hitter with 17 home runs and 193 RBI in 554 games. Bucher died in Elizabethtown, Pennsylvania, at age 93.

References

External links

Retrosheet

Boston Red Sox players
Brooklyn Dodgers players
St. Louis Cardinals players
Major League Baseball third basemen
Major League Baseball second basemen
Major League Baseball outfielders
People from Manassas, Virginia
1911 births
2004 deaths
Waynesboro Red Birds players
Scottdale Cardinals players
Elmira Red Wings players
Greensboro Patriots players
Columbus Red Birds players
Toledo Mud Hens players
Houston Buffaloes players
Toronto Maple Leafs (International League) players
Portland Beavers players
Baseball players from Virginia